Yuen Kong San Tsuen is a village in Pat Heung, Yuen Long District, Hong Kong.

Administration
Yuen Kong San Tsuen is a recognized village under the New Territories Small House Policy.

References

External links

 Delineation of area of existing village Yuen Kong San Tsuen (Pat Heung) for election of resident representative (2019 to 2022)

Villages in Yuen Long District, Hong Kong
Pat Heung